"Jus' a Rascal" is the third single by British rapper Dizzee Rascal, and third and final single from his debut studio album, Boy in da Corner. The single became his third top 40 hit, peaking at number 30 and spending three weeks inside the top 75 of the UK Singles Chart.

"Jus' a Rascal" was used in an episode of Skins along with "Fix Up, Look Sharp", and in the film Kidulthood. Part of the song is also used in series three of Hustle.

Track listing

Music video
A music video was made for the song and is mainly filled up with Dizzee Rascal dancing. Tinchy Stryder makes a cameo in the video. The video was filmed during David Blaine's exit from the container during his Above the Below endurance stunt.

Charts

References

2002 songs
2003 singles
Dizzee Rascal songs
XL Recordings singles
Songs written by Dizzee Rascal
UK Independent Singles Chart number-one singles